Blue Funk is the fourth album by rap group Heavy D & the Boyz. It was released on January 12, 1993 for Uptown Records and was produced by DJ Eddie F, DJ Premier, Pete Rock, Jesse West aka 3rd Eye and Tony Dofat. Blue Funk made it to #40 on the Billboard 200 and #7 on the Top R&B/Hip-Hop Albums chart, and was certified gold. The album spawned three singles, "Who's the Man", "Blue Funk (Heavy D)" and "Truthful (Heavy D)". Guests on the album include Terri & Monica, 3rd Eye, The Notorious B.I.G., Busta Rhymes, Gang Starr and Rob-O.

Track listing
"Truthful"- 4:42
"Who's the Man"- 4:06
"Talk Is Cheap"- 4:04
"Girl"- 4:58
"It's a New Day"- 5:22
"Who's in the House"- 4:09
"Love Sexy"- 4:28
"Slow Down"- 4:14
"Silky"- 3:40
"Here Comes the Heavster"- 4:53
"Blue Funk"- 4:35
"Yes Y'All"- 4:01
"A Buncha Niggas" feat. Gang Starr, 3rd Eye, The Notorious B.I.G., Busta Rhymes & Rob-O- 5:06

Charts

Certifications

References

External links
Heavy D & the Boyz-Nuttin' But Love at Discogs

1992 albums
Albums produced by DJ Premier
Albums produced by Pete Rock
MCA Records albums
Heavy D albums
Uptown Records albums